The New Castle Nocks were an Ohio–Pennsylvania League minor league baseball team that played from 1907 to 1912. The team was based in New Castle, Pennsylvania. Its nickname was a shortened version of Neshannock.

Major league alumni
The following are the team's known major league alumni.

1907: Harry Camnitz, Al Schweitzer, Bill Steen
1908: Ody Abbott, Camnitz, Jim Miller, Doc Ralston, George Stutz
1909: Abbott, Ned Crompton
1910: Abbott, Roy Golden
1911: Zip Collins, Arthur Hauger, Ed Hilley, Joe Houser, Al Humphrey, Frank Lobert, Joe Sugden (player/manager)
1912: Charlie Smith (manager)

References

Defunct minor league baseball teams
Baseball teams established in 1907
Defunct baseball teams in Pennsylvania
Ohio-Pennsylvania League teams